Pio Marmaï (born 13 July 1984) is a French actor. He has appeared in more than twenty films since 2008.

Early life and education
Marmaï was born on 13 July 1984. His mother is a former costume designer at the Opéra de Strasbourg, and his father a set designer.  Marmaï studied at the Scuola Commedia dell'Arte and Créteil Conservatoire near Paris, and drama school at Saint-Étienne.

Filmography

Theatre

References

External links 

 

1984 births
Living people
Actors from Strasbourg
French male film actors
French male stage actors
French male television actors
21st-century French male actors